Miriam Guadalupe Aguirre Olmos (born 29 January 1999) is a Mexican professional football goalkeeper who currently plays for Pachuca of the Liga MX Femenil.

Honors and awards

International
Mexico U17
 CONCACAF Women's U-17 Championship: 2013

Mexico U20
 CONCACAF Women's U-20 Championship: 2018

References

External links 
 

1999 births
Living people
Women's association football goalkeepers
Mexican women's footballers
Footballers from the State of Mexico
People from Ecatepec de Morelos
Liga MX Femenil players
C.F. Pachuca (women) footballers
Club Universidad Nacional (women) footballers
20th-century Mexican women
21st-century Mexican women
Mexican footballers